Sir Alexander Lockwood Smith  (born 13 November 1948) is a New Zealand politician and diplomat who was High Commissioner of New Zealand to the United Kingdom from 2013 to 2017, and Speaker of the House of Representatives from 2008 to 2013.

Smith is a member of the New Zealand National Party and served as a Member of Parliament (MP) from 1984 until his retirement to pursue diplomatic roles in 2013. He represented first the Kaipara electorate and then Rodney, and has held a number of Cabinet positions; he was Minister of Education from 1990 to 1996 and subsequently served as Minister of Agriculture, Minister for International Trade, and Associate Minister of Finance.

Early years
Smith attended Auckland Grammar School in 1961. He has a PhD in Animal science from the University of Adelaide. Before entering politics he lectured at Massey University, worked as a television quizmaster for the children's quiz shows It's Academic and The W 3 Show, and was Marketing Manager at the New Zealand Dairy Board.

Member of Parliament

Smith was first elected in 1984 as the MP for Kaipara. He represented this electorate until it was abolished in 1996 during the shift to mixed-member proportional (MMP) representation. Following the  election he was the representative for Rodney until the  election where he stood as a list-only candidate and was elected as a List MP.

Minister in the Fourth National Government 
Smith served as Minister of Education from 1990 until 1996 in the Fourth National Government of New Zealand. During this period he implemented a number of changes to the tertiary education sector (universities and technical institutions). One high-profile change involved a radical increase in student fees, as recommended by the Todd Report, which the government had commissioned to address issues of funding.

As opposition education spokesman in 1990, Smith promised to remove the Labour Government's tertiary tuition fee of $1250, if elected. Once in office, he kept this promise on a technicality: he shifted the burden of charging fees for courses from the government to the institutions, who then had to charge even higher tuition fees due to decreased government funding.

Smith's term as Education Minister also saw the introduction of means-testing for student allowances, with the effect that students of middle-class parents became ineligible for allowances until they reached 25 years of age.

In 1996 Smith took up the Agriculture and Trade Negotiation portfolios: Wyatt Creech succeeded him as Education Minister. Smith also became Minister for International Trade and for Tourism, as well as holding responsibilities as Associate Minister of Finance, Associate Minister of Immigration (International Access and Processing), and Minister Responsible for Contact Energy Ltd.

As Trade Minister, Smith spearheaded New Zealand's efforts at the 1999 APEC negotiations. He successfully negotiated New Zealand's free-trade agreement with Singapore, which became the NZ – Singapore Closer Economic Partnership. At the WTO Ministerial in Seattle, he took part in efforts which later lead to the Doha Development Round.

Opposition, 1999–2008
In opposition, Smith held a number of spokesperson roles for the National Party, including those of Foreign Affairs, Commerce, and Immigration. In his role as Immigration spokesman, Smith challenged Mangere MP Taito Phillip Field over alleged impropriety in Field's dealings with constituents.

During the 2008 election campaign, on 22 October 2008, Smith made some comments in an interview with The Marlborough Express concerning seasonal Asian and Pacific workers that caused controversy. Regarding Pacific workers he said that some employers "are having to teach them things like how to use a toilet or shower..." And he said that for pruning trees: "some of the Asian workers have been more productive... because their hands are smaller." Maori Party co-leader Tariana Turia described these remarks as "racist", and the Prime Minister Helen Clark characterised them as "absolutely daft". Smith later stated that the media had presented his comments out of context, and that he had repeated the views of employers whom he had talked to; he expressed regret at any unintended offence taken. The parliamentary leader of the National Party, John Key, subsequently referred to this statement as an apology.

Speaker of the House 
Following the National Party's successes in the 2008 election, Members of Parliament unanimously elected Smith as Speaker of the House.  Smith took a rather different approach from his predecessor, being more active in requiring ministers to provide answers to oral questions. Smith was re-elected as Speaker of the House again on 20 December 2011.

Smith was expected to retire from Parliament and to be appointed High Commissioner of New Zealand to the United Kingdom later in 2012, but stayed on until February 2013. He gave his valedictory speech on 13 February 2013; this was in fact his first speech in Parliament in four years, as Speakers perform an apolitical role. Reflecting on his nearly 30 years in Parliament, he listed voting against the Homosexual Law Reform Bill in 1986 as his biggest regret:

I faced the classic dilemma of voting according to my own judgement or the opinion of those I was elected to represent. As a new member, I opted for the latter and I've always regretted it.

Smith was appointed a Knight Companion of the New Zealand Order of Merit in the 2013 Birthday Honours for services as a Member of Parliament and as Speaker of the House of Representatives.

High Commissioner to the United Kingdom
Smith began his term as High Commissioner of New Zealand to the United Kingdom on 25 March 2013, with a powhiri at New Zealand House in London. He stepped down from the role on 25 March 2017. He was replaced by Sir Jerry Mateparae, the former Governor-General.

Personal life
On 4 July 2009 he married longtime partner, Alexandra Lang, in the Legislative Council Chamber of Parliament.

Notes

References

External links 

 National Party Bio
 Parliamentary page
 Lockwood Smith marries

1948 births
People educated at Auckland Grammar School
Living people
Academic staff of the Massey University
Members of the Cabinet of New Zealand
New Zealand National Party MPs
New Zealand list MPs
Speakers of the New Zealand House of Representatives
Members of the New Zealand House of Representatives
University of Adelaide alumni
New Zealand MPs for Auckland electorates
New Zealand education ministers
High Commissioners of New Zealand to the United Kingdom
Knights Companion of the New Zealand Order of Merit
New Zealand game show hosts
21st-century New Zealand politicians
People from the Kaipara District
New Zealand politicians awarded knighthoods